Ronald Philippe Bär, (born July 29, 1928) is a retired Dutch Roman Catholic bishop. He was born in Manado, North Sulawesi, then Dutch East Indies. He was bishop of the Diocese of Rotterdam from October 19, 1983, to March 13, 1993, as well as bishop of the Dutch military ordinariate. He resigned unexpectedly because of rumours of homosexual contacts.

Roman Catholic sex abuse case
In 2011, Bär's name was mentioned in connection with a sex abuse case involving a Roman Catholic priest, who reportedly abused dozens of children in the period from 1987 to 2008:
"The cardinal (Cardinal Simonis) was told by the then bishop of Rotterdam, Philippe Bär, that the priest had sexually abused underage boys in his parish in Zoetermeer. Bishop Bär wanted the priest out of his diocese. Archbishop Simonis then arranged for the man to be moved to a parish in Amersfoort."

See also
 Cardinal Adrianus Johannes Simonis

References

1928 births
Living people
People from Manado
20th-century Roman Catholic bishops in the Netherlands
Catholic Church sexual abuse scandals in Europe
Religious controversies in the Netherlands
Ecclesiastical passivity to Catholic sexual abuse cases
Dutch Roman Catholic bishops